Raise the People is the third studio album by Australian Alternative rock band Calling All Cars, released on 7 March 2014.

Track listing
 "Raise the People"	
 "Black & White"	
 "Standing in the Ocean"	
 "Werewolves"	
 "Every Day Is the Same"	
 "Good God!"	
 "It Don't Matter"	
 "Running On the Sun"
 "My Red Light"	
 "Looking Through Your Window"

Charts

References

Calling All Cars (band) albums
2014 albums
Albums produced by Tom Larkin